The spotted straw moth (Heliocheilus turbata) is a moth in the family Noctuidae. It is found in North America, including Georgia.

Heliocheilus lupatus is no longer considered a synonym of Heliocheilus turbata.

External links
Image
Bug Guide

Heliocheilus
Moths of North America
Moths described in 1858